The Seagull Monument is a small monument situated immediately in front of the Salt Lake Assembly Hall on Temple Square, in Salt Lake City, Utah. The Monument commemorates what some members of the Church of Jesus Christ of Latter-day Saints (LDS Church) call the miracle of the gulls.

History

In 1848 the Mormon pioneers planted crops for their first spring season in Utah. As the crops ripened, Mormon crickets descended upon the farms from the foothills east of the valley. The insects consumed entire fields. The harvest was saved when the pioneer farmers knelt in prayer, which prayers were answered by flocks of native seagulls which devoured the crickets. This event, popularly called the "miracle of the gulls", is remembered by Latter-day Saints as a miracle. 
To celebrate the role seagulls played in the pioneer's first year in Utah, the LDS Church erected Seagull Monument on their Temple Square in Salt Lake City, Utah. The top of the monument is a bronze statue of two insect-devouring seagulls cast by sculptor Mahonri M. Young, who designed the monument. Young studied in France, and was grandson of LDS leader Brigham Young. The monument was dedicated October 1, 1913, by LDS Church president Joseph F. Smith. The Seagull Monument is believed to be the first monument dedicated to birds.

The monument is featured in the 1940 film, Brigham Young.

Notes

External links

An on-line tour of Temple Square from allaboutmormons.com

1913 sculptures
Animal monuments
Bronze sculptures in Utah
Gulls
Monuments and memorials in Utah
Outdoor sculptures in Salt Lake City
Sculptures of birds in the United States
Temple Square